Flor Denis Ruiz Hurtado (born 29 January 1991 in Pradera, Valle del Cauca) is a Colombian javelin thrower. She competed in the javelin throw event at the 2012 and 2016 Summer Olympics, reaching the final in 2016.

Personal bests
Javelin throw: 63.84 m – Cali, Colombia 25 June 2016 - AR, NR

Competition record

References

External links

1991 births
Living people
Colombian female javelin throwers
Olympic athletes of Colombia
Athletes (track and field) at the 2012 Summer Olympics
Athletes (track and field) at the 2016 Summer Olympics
Pan American Games competitors for Colombia
Athletes (track and field) at the 2015 Pan American Games
Athletes (track and field) at the 2019 Pan American Games
World Athletics Championships athletes for Colombia
South American Games gold medalists for Colombia
South American Games medalists in athletics
Central American and Caribbean Games gold medalists for Colombia
Competitors at the 2010 South American Games
Competitors at the 2014 South American Games
Competitors at the 2014 Central American and Caribbean Games
Central American and Caribbean Games medalists in athletics
Sportspeople from Valle del Cauca Department
20th-century Colombian women
21st-century Colombian women